Kermit Roosevelt Schmidt (March 31, 1908 – December 1963) was an American football end and halfback in the National Football League for the Boston Braves and Cincinnati Reds between 1932 and 1933. He was born in Okeene, Oklahoma.

Early life
Schmidt attended Manual Arts High School in Los Angeles.  He played college football for the Cal Aggies at the Northern Branch of the College of Agriculture.

Notes

References

External links
Schmidt's pro football statistics

1908 births
1963 deaths
People from Blaine County, Oklahoma
Players of American football from Oklahoma
American football wide receivers
American football halfbacks
UC Davis Aggies football players
Boston Braves (NFL) players
Cincinnati Reds (NFL) players